Peninta Peninta (in English Fifty-Fifty) is a Greek television series that was first aired from 2005 to 2007 by Mega Channel. Due to the great success, the series returned the 2010–11 season with 15 new episodes. The series stars Petros Filippidis, Pavlos Haikalis, Sakis Boulas and others. It won two television awards in 2007, for the best actor (Petros Filippidis) and the best supporting actor (Pygmalion Dadakaridis).

Synospsis
The series portrays the lives of three couples in their fifties. The men are frequently flirtatious and they are entangled in various adventures.

Cast

Main
 Petros Filippidis 	
 Pavlos Haikalis 	
 Sakis Boulas 	
 Ava Galanopoulou	
 Vana Rambota 	
 Maria Androutsou 	
 Pigmalion Dadakaridis 	
 Nikoleta Karra
 Sofia Panagou
 Thanos Tokakis
 Fotini Tsakiri

Special guest appearances
 Alkis Panagiotidis
 Kostas Triantafyllopoulos
 Michael Giannatos
 Yannis Aivazis

References

External links

Greek comedy television series
Mega Channel original programming
2005 Greek television series debuts
2007 Greek television series endings